The Waimangu Geyser, located near Rotorua in New Zealand, was for a time the most powerful geyser in the world.

The Geyser was seen erupting in late 1900. Day trip visitors from Rotorua were keen to see the geyser erupting regularly for 5–6 hours out of a cycle of about 36 hours, and a tourist trip called the "Round Trip" ran from the summer of 1902/1903. The geyser was the catalyst for tourism to the Waimangu Valley.

Its workings were apparently created by the great 1886 Mount Tarawera eruption. The water expelled by the geyser was black with rocks and mud from the surrounding terrain, so the indigenous Māori people named the geyser Waimangu, meaning 'Black Waters'. The geyser gave its name to the surrounding geothermal region, the Waimangu Volcanic Rift Valley.

Joseph Perry of the Limelight Department of the Salvation Army filmed the Waimangu Geyser in action.

In August 1903, tourist guide Alfred Warbrick measured the depth of the  geyser lake at only  when he launched a rowboat on the lake as a result of a dare. The lake's shallow depth was attributed to much of the ejected solid material falling back into the vent each time.

On 30 August 1903, New Zealand rugby international Joe Warbrick, David McNaughton, and sisters Ruby and Catherine Nicholls were killed after venturing close to the edge of the geyser, having ignored requests from Warbrick's brother Alfred to return to a safe distance. The four were scalded and then swept away in a sudden violent eruption.

In mid-1904, the geyser became dormant for several weeks and subsequent eruptions were shorter and weaker until they stopped on 1 November 1904. This coincided with a landslide that changed the water table of Lake Tarawera by several metres. While it was hypothesized that this was the cause for the extinction of the geyser, later studies found no apparent physical connection between these two events.

The geyser became extinct in 1908. Afterwards, hydrothermal activity in the nearby Echo Crater increased, leading to eruptions in the crater in 1915, 1917, and 1924.

References

External links 

 Historical photos of Waimangu Geyser, State Library of Victoria
 Waimangu geyser: the world’s largest, 'Hot springs, mud pools and geysers', Te Ara: The Encyclopedia of New Zealand. Updated 5 November 2007.
 Images of the Waimangu Geyser from the Alexander Turnbull Library's Unpublished Collections

Rotorua
Geysers of New Zealand
Okataina Volcanic Centre
Landforms of the Bay of Plenty Region